Iraq competed at the 2020 Summer Olympics in Tokyo. Originally scheduled to take place from 24 July to 9 August 2020, the Games were postponed to 23 July to 8 August 2021, due to the COVID-19 pandemic. This was the nation's fifteenth appearance at the Summer Olympic Games since its debut in 1948.

Competitors
The following is the list of number of competitors in the Games.

Athletics

Iraq received a universality slot from World Athletics to send a male track and field athlete to the Olympics.

Track & road events

Rowing

Iraq qualified one boat in the men's single sculls for the Games by finishing fourth at final-B and securing the fourth of five berths available at the 2021 FISA Asia & Oceania Olympic Qualification Regatta in Tokyo, Japan. 

Qualification Legend: FA=Final A (medal); FB=Final B (non-medal); FC=Final C (non-medal); FD=Final D (non-medal); FE=Final E (non-medal); FF=Final F (non-medal); SA/B=Semifinals A/B; SC/D=Semifinals C/D; SE/F=Semifinals E/F; QF=Quarterfinals; R=Repechage

Shooting

Iraq received an invitation from the Tripartite Commission to send a women's air pistol shooter to the Olympics, as long as the minimum qualifying score (MQS) was fulfilled by June 5, 2021.

See also
Iraq at the 2020 Summer Paralympics

References

Nations at the 2020 Summer Olympics
2020